Nathalie Hibon (born 24 April 1969) is a French archer. She competed at the 1988 Summer Olympics and the 1992 Summer Olympics.

References

1969 births
Living people
French female archers
Olympic archers of France
Archers at the 1988 Summer Olympics
Archers at the 1992 Summer Olympics
People from Meaux
20th-century French women